Killer Ridge is a dark ridge rising over  between Crisp Glacier and Miller Glacier in the Gonville and Caius Range, in Victoria Land, Antarctica. It was charted by the British Antarctic Expedition, 1910–13, and named after the killer whale, the outline of which the ridge is said to resemble.

References

Ridges of Victoria Land
Scott Coast